is a Japanese footballer who plays as a midfielder for Kyoto Sanga.

Club career
Yamada made his professional debut in a 3–1 Emperor's Cup win against FC Imabari.

Career statistics

Club

References

External links

2001 births
Living people
Association football people from Shiga Prefecture
Japanese footballers
Japan youth international footballers
Association football midfielders
Kyoto Sanga FC players